Navika or NAVIKA may refer to:
 An International Trade Mark   navika  held by NAVIKA USA Inc  navika.com  a manufacturer of Golf, Tennis corporate gifts and jewelry located in California, USA. The name was developed in 1984 based on a combination of the first two letters of the founder's name(NA), her husband(VI), her older daughter (VI) and younger daughter (KA).
 North America Vishwa Kannada Association, an association of Kannadigas in North America.
 Navika (album), a 2011 album by Montenegrin pop singer Vlado Georgiev.